The Chinese Ambassador to Iceland is the official representative of the People's Republic of China to Iceland.

List of representatives

See also
China–Iceland relations

References 

Ambassadors of China to Iceland
Iceland
China